The 2009 FIA GT Tourist Trophy was the first round of the 2009 FIA GT Championship season and the 62nd running of the RAC Tourist Trophy.  It was held at the Silverstone Circuit, United Kingdom on 3 May 2009.  It featured the race debut of the Ford GT and the Nissan GT-R in the GT1 category in preparation for their entry in the 2010 FIA GT1 World Championship.

Report

Qualifying
The #80 Hexis Racing Aston Martin was moved to the back of the starting grid after failing post-qualifying technical inspection.  The car was found to be below the minimum ride height and carrying components of an incorrect size.

Qualifying result
Pole position winners in each class are marked in bold.

Race
Austrian Karl Wendlinger and Brit Ryan Sharp won their second successive RAC Tourist Trophy after having won the event the previous year for Jetalliance Racing.  The GT2 category was led by the Porsche of Prospeed Competition.

Race result
Class winners in bold.  Cars failing to complete 75% of winner's distance marked as Not Classified (NC).

References

Tourist Trophy
Tourist Trophy
RAC Tourist Trophy